Whitehall Stadium is an Irish football ground located in the north Dublin suburb of Whitehall, bordering Drumcondra. It is currently the home ground of club Home Farm.  Home Farm moved here in 1989 when Shelbourne acquired their current home, Tolka Park.

The stadium has hosted numerous international underage games including games in the 1994 UEFA European Under-16 Football Championship.

Whitehall was selected as a venue for the 2019 UEFA European Under-17 Championship. The venue hosted four Group Stage matches.

References

Home Farm F.C.
Association football venues in the Republic of Ireland
Buildings and structures in Dublin (city)
Sports venues in Dublin (city)
Association football venues in County Dublin